Pan Yaung Chel (born 14 January 1996) is an Anglo-Burmese singer-songwriter and actress best known for her pop songs, films and commercials (television and photo). She rose to fame with her debut album "Wake Up Daddy!" which is a duet album with her father Graham, a legendary Burmese pop singer. She was born and raised in Myanmar and later at the age of 10, moved to Australia with her family for her studies.

Life and career

1996–2013: Early life and living abroad
Pan Yaung Chel was born to Graham and Thin Zar Oo in Yangon, Myanmar on 14 January 1996. She became the elder daughter of her family when her little sister Pan Thun Chel was born on the same day as her birthday in 2001. She grew up in Myanmar and studied in international schools in Yangon. She released her first ever song, "Twinkle Twinkle Little Star", in Yin Mar Record Label's Children's Songs album at the age of 9.

Later at the age of around 11, Pan Yaung Chel and her family moved to Perth, Australia for her and her little sister's education. In 2012, when Pan Yaung Chel was still in high school, her father, mother and her little sister returned to Myanmar while she stayed behind in Australia to continue her education. She went to continue her secondary studies at St Brigid's College, an independent Roman Catholic, day and boarding school for girls, where she graduated as the class of 2013. In March 2013, Graham held his solo concert in Yangon, she sang Adele's Someone Like You at her father's concert, where she was praised for her singing abilities.

2014–2017: Career beginnings with "Wake Up Daddy!"

After high school she went onto study architecture at The University of Western Australia. But before she began studying at the university, Pan Yaung Chel took a gap year in 2014 where she worked on her debut album "Wake Up Daddy!" together with her father, Graham.

The most popular track of the album was "Wake Up Daddy!" which was loved by many, from children to teenagers, to the adults. It was known for being the song that children fans of both Graham and Pan Yaung Chel sing to their fathers in the mornings when they wake them up. The song was based on the real life experience Pan Yaung Chel and her family had in Australia, while they were living there. The DVD of the album came out nearly two years later, on 21 December 2016, with 14 music videos inside.

2018–present: New music

Pan Yaung Chel has been stating in her current interviews that she is going to release her first solo album mid 2018 at the latest. She released her first single for 2018 – "Butterflies", written together with her father, on 9 February through her Facebook page and YouTube channel. Her second single for 2018 came out on 16 March, titled "You Set Me Free" and was written by herself. Five days later, she also released a dance practice video of the song on her Facebook page and YouTube channel. On 17 November 2018, Pan Yaung Chel released a music video for her first single "Let It Go" which is one of the tracks in her upcoming solo album. The music video became widely popular since the day she released it on her official Facebook page and YouTube channel, and was praised for the quality and input of the cast and production team involved in this music video. The music video was an action-based music video where Pan Yaung Chel got to show her acting skills and a tough side of her for the first time to the public by playing the character of a police woman who was in love with a drug dealer, who was played by Daung. Many of her fans were excited to see the full music video ever since she dropped the teaser 5 days before she released the full version, and suggested her to start considering acting in films.

2019: The beginning of an acting career

Pan Yaung Chel's acting career began with her first ever film work named "Lake Pyar" - a Canal+ original series, which began airing nationwide on the 17th of October 2019, in which she played the character of Lake Pyar. "Lake Pyar" is a crime detective series written and directed by Nyan Htin about a female junior detective by the name of Lake Pyar (which means butterfly) and her co-workers, solving criminal cases in the city of Yangon, Myanmar. Season 1 of "Lake Pyar" consists of eight episodes and each episode has a different criminal case. "Lake Pyar" became popular and well-loved for its story, casts, the quality of production, and for it being one of the few films/series in Myanmar that has a female hero character, or in other words, is led by a female actress. CANAL+ took a huge risk casting a singer as the lead for its series. But with her first-ever role, Pan Yaung Chel was awarded the National Winner of Myanmar for Best Actress In A Leading Role for the Asian Academy Creative Awards - one of Asia-Pacific's most prestigious awards. In recent interviews, Pan Yaung Chel said she will also start working on other films in 2020 which will go on the big screens later in the coming years. Season 2 of "Lake Pyar" began airing on CANAL+ on the 28th of January, 2021.

Brand Endorsements/ Brand Ambassadorships
Pan Yaung Chel is also well known for being the face of many international brands. The first brand she worked as the Brand Endorser was for Dutch Mill. She worked with Dutch Mill for a year from the end of 2016 until the end of 2017. She has been working as Sunsilk's first ever Burmese Brand Ambassador since 2017 and recently announced that she has renewed her contract with Sunsilk in 2020 for another 2 years of Brand Ambassadorship. She worked as Nescafé's Brand Ambassador for a year from June 2017 until June 2018 and their campaign was also promoted nationwide.

Pan Yaung Chel will be renewing her Brand Ambassadorship contract with Samsung for the fifth year in 2021. She had also been working as their Ambassador since 2017 and continues to work with Samsung for their latest products. She has been working with Cute Press, a famous Thai cosmetic brand, as their first Burmese Brand Ambassador since 2017. Collaborations with the brand can be seen in her single "Butterflies" where it endorsed Cute Press's Magic Cover Foundation Powder in the music video. Pan Yaung Chel and her family began representing Mitsubishi Motors as their first ever Brand Ambassadors in Myanmar, from September 2019. These international brands have been renewing B.A contracts with Pan Yaung Chel for consecutive years. Other brands she worked with for television commercials and print ads, but not as their Brand Ambassador includes – Estee Lauder, Armani Exchange, MAMA noodles, Hearty Heart cosmetics, 100 PLUS isotonic drink, Cufo throat lozenges, Gery cracker, Gery crunch roll, Dr. Somchai, Sunplay, Hydro+ and many more.

Pan Yaung Chel is the first ever and the only female celebrity in Myanmar to collaborate with VISA and print her face on a VISA card. On the 15th of August 2020, UAB bank launched Myanmar's first ever Celebrity Gift Card together with Pan Yaung Chel and VISA. The cards came in four different designs and each came with its own story based on Pan Yaung Chel's life. These prepaid VISA gift cards can be purchased in stores and online, and can be used both online and offline internationally, where VISA is available.

Personal life

Religion and philanthropy
Pan Yaung Chel was raised Catholic, with her mother and little sister a Catholic and her father a Buddhist. She went to study at independent Catholic schools in Australia during her primary school and high school years. In December 2017 when Pope Francis visited Myanmar, the first time a pope has ever visited the country, Pan Yaung Chel and her father sang gospel songs before the public mass began. She sang Hallelujah and Be Born in Me, while Graham sang one of his own many Burmese gospel song. She also sang the Psalms during Pope Francis' Youth Mass which was held a day after the Public Mass. Pan Yaung Chel and her family frequently donates to orphanages, schools and many other charities throughout each year.

Language(s)
Pan Yaung Chel speaks her native language Burmese alongside native English and proficient Korean.

Discography

Solo albums
 Wake Up Daddy! (2015)
 Solo (2020)

Singles
 Butterflies (2018)
 You Set Me Free (2018)
 Let It Go (2018)
 Lwal Ba Ma Lar (2019)

Songs from collaborative albums
 Ba Wa Ye' A Date Bal (Myit Zi Ma Go Thwar Ja Myi) (2014)
 Maung Lu Chaw (Padamyar FM) (2016)
 Dream Holiday (Cherry FM 7th Anniversary) (2017)
 Kyin Nar Chin Yel Ah Chit Yel (Sal Nhit Sal Moe) (2017)
 Ka Na Oo Pone Pyin (Sal Nhit Sal Moe) (2017)
 Tha Chin Ne' Ka Khone Lite (Thingyan Fever) (2017)
 Kat Chit Mal (April Queens) (2017)
 Amone Ni Dan (Music Soon Lan Lil' Chan – Lil' Chan) (2017)
 Shall We Meet Again (Kiss Museum – James) (2017)
 Diary (Gi Ta Bay Da – Hlwan Paing) (2017)
 Bar Kyaunt (Man Thiri 20th Anniversary) (2018)

Filmography

Awards and nominations

References

External links

Burmese singer-songwriters
1996 births
Living people
People from Yangon
Burmese people of Shan descent
Burmese Roman Catholics
Australian pop singers
21st-century Australian women singers
21st-century Burmese women singers